The Dobric is a right tributary of the river Lăpuș in Romania. It flows into the Lăpuș near Târgu Lăpuș.

References

Rivers of Romania
Rivers of Maramureș County